Tuck Box is a box set by Nick Drake. It was released in December 2013 under Island Records.

Track listing
All tracks written and performed by Nick Drake except where noted.

References

2014 compilation albums
Island Records compilation albums
Nick Drake compilation albums